Lake Arrowhead State Park is a state park located in Clay County, Texas, near Wichita Falls.

History 
Lake Arrowhead was built as a water source for the city of Wichita Falls and the surrounding area.  The surrounding state park land was purchased from the city in 1970, and the park opened the same year.

Recreation 
The park offers ranger-led educational programs throughout the year. The park has facilities for picnicking, fishing, swimming, boating, water skiing, nature study, hiking, wildlife observation, horseback riding, camping, and disc golf.

See also 

 List of Texas state parks

References

External links 

 Official Site

State parks of Texas
Protected areas established in 1970
1970 establishments in Texas